The 2022 Open Sud de France was a tennis tournament played on indoor hard courts. It was the 35th edition of the event, and part of the ATP Tour 250 series of the 2022 ATP Tour. It took place at the Arena Montpellier in Montpellier, France, from January 31 to February 6, 2022.

Champions

Singles 

  Alexander Bublik def.  Alexander Zverev, 6–4, 6–3

This was Bublik's maiden ATP Tour singles title.

Doubles 

  Pierre-Hugues Herbert /  Nicolas Mahut def.  Lloyd Glasspool /  Harri Heliövaara, 4–6, 7–6(7–3), [12–10].

Point and prize money

Point distribution

Prize money 

*per team

Singles main draw entrants

Seeds 

1 Rankings are as of 17 January 2022.

Other entrants 
The following players received wildcards into the singles main draw :
  David Goffin
  Lucas Pouille
  Alexander Zverev

The following player received entry using a protected ranking into the singles main draw:
  Jo-Wilfried Tsonga

The following players received entry from the qualifying draw:
  Damir Džumhur
  Pierre-Hugues Herbert
  Gilles Simon
  Kacper Żuk

Withdrawals 
Before the tournament
  Félix Auger-Aliassime → replaced by  Corentin Moutet
  Borna Ćorić → replaced by  Adrian Mannarino
  Arthur Rinderknech → replaced by  Peter Gojowczyk
  Botic van de Zandschulp → replaced by  Mikael Ymer

Retirements
  Gilles Simon

Doubles main draw entrants

Seeds 

1 Rankings are as of 17 January 2022.

Other entrants 
The following pairs received wildcards into the doubles main draw:
  Robin Bertrand /  Antoine Hoang
  Sascha Gueymard Wayenburg /  Luca Van Assche

The following pair received entry using a protected ranking into the doubles main draw:
  Fabrice Martin /  Jo-Wilfried Tsonga

Withdrawals 
 Before the tournament
  Ivan Dodig /  Marcelo Melo → replaced by  Marcelo Melo /  Alexander Zverev
  Tallon Griekspoor /  Botic van de Zandschulp → replaced by  Denys Molchanov /  David Vega Hernández
  Ilya Ivashka /  Andrei Vasilevski → replaced by  Albano Olivetti /  Lucas Pouille
  Jonny O'Mara /  Ken Skupski → replaced by  Jonny O'Mara /  Hunter Reese

References

External links 
 

 
2022 ATP Tour